Ludwig Jahn (born 27 June 1959) is a German former bobsledder. He competed in the four man event at the 1988 Winter Olympics.

References

External links
 

1959 births
Living people
Sportspeople from Brandenburg an der Havel
People from Bezirk Potsdam
German male bobsledders
Olympic bobsledders of East Germany
Bobsledders at the 1988 Winter Olympics